Manuel Torrente (7 June 1908 – September 1948) was an Argentine fencer. He competed at the 1936 and 1948 Summer Olympics.

References

1908 births
1948 deaths
Argentine male fencers
Olympic fencers of Argentina
Fencers at the 1936 Summer Olympics
Fencers at the 1948 Summer Olympics